The Love Lane Liverpool and District Cricket Competition is regarded as the top level of competition for recreational club cricket in the Liverpool area and since 2000 has been a designated ECB Premier League. The Competition operates a three divisional system with Premier, First and Second Divisions. The Southport and District Amateur Cricket League is its feeder league.

History
Although many of the district's clubs had met regularly as far back as 1850, if not earlier, it was not until 1892 that a Liverpool newspaper began publishing a weekly table and calling it the Liverpool Competition to create more interest in the game. The eleven senior clubs making up the original table were Birkenhead Park, Bootle, Formby, Huyton, Liverpool, New Brighton, Northern, Ormskirk, Oxton, Rock Ferry and Sefton.

Neston were offered first team fixtures in 1908 and, in 1919, Hightown and Southport and Birkdale joined whilst Wallasey took over the fixtures of the Rock Ferry club who did not resume after the First War. Boughton Hall (later known as Chester Boughton Hall) were invited to join in 1923. The Competition continued until 1947 when it was decided to admit a sixteenth club, and Preston were voted in. Two years later, fixtures were standardised by all clubs agreeing to meet each other, and although there was no suggestion of a league, it was decided to regard the table as official. Preston resigned at the end of the 1952 season to be replaced by St Helens Recs in 1953.

In recent years the Liverpool and District Cricket Competition has changed radically. There was an expansion in 1996 that introduced clubs from further afield in Lancashire and North Wales but saw founder members Birkenhead Park, Chester Boughton Hall, Neston and Oxton resign to join the Cheshire County Cricket League for the 1998 season. Of the four, only Oxton had failed to be champions of the Liverpool and District Cricket Competition. In 1999 a two division structure was introduced, and in 2000 the 1st XI Premier Division was awarded ECB Premier League status.

From the end of the 2004 season, promotion from and relegation to the Merseyside and Southport Cricket Alliance feeder league was introduced, but was then curtailed from the end of the 2009 season. At this time, additional clubs from the Alliance were invited to join, to form a new three divisional structure.

2nd XIs play in a similar three divisional structure but independent of the 1st XIs. There is a two divisional structure for Saturday 3rd XIs and below, with another structure for those clubs preferring to play on Sundays. They have four Divisions, North East, North West, South East and South West.

Champions

Premier Division performance by season from 2003

See also
 List of English and Welsh cricket league clubs

References

External links
 Official website
 play-cricket website

English domestic cricket competitions
Cricket in Merseyside
Sports competitions in Liverpool
ECB Premier Leagues